ITH Pharma is a specialist British compounding pharmaceutical company, founded in 2008 by two pharmacists who started their careers in the NHS.

History
It began in 1997 when Hamling spotted a gap in the market for patients to get complex intravenous treatments on a same-day basis. Bloom and Hamling raised £150,000 from family to start their first compounding company. 

They received their license from the MHRA in August 1998 and pioneered a same-day intravenous medication service, through their first contract from the Royal Brompton Hospital, London for prefilled syringes of antibiotics for cystic fibrosis children. 

After selling their first company, they used the proceeds to set up ITH Pharma in 2008. ITH Pharma is the largest provider of reactive, same-day, specialist, intravenous products in the UK, feeding 1000 patients per day and treating over 2000 patients per day on chemotherapy.

Controversy
In June 2014, a batch of intravenous feed supplied to hospitals by ITH Pharma in the UK for neonatal care was delivered in an allegedly contaminated state, with about 16 alleged cases of blood poisoning in infants.

On 31 October 2018 the BBC reported that ITH Pharma were charged with a number of offences following the deaths and illness of babies in some hospitals in England.  They were charged with seven counts of supplying medicinal product not of the quality specified in the prescription.  They were also charged with failing to take reasonable steps to ensure patients are not infected by contaminants, in breach of the Health and Safety at Work Act.  The babies, many of whom were premature, were being fed through drips in neonatal intensive care units, between 2009 and 2014.  ITH Pharma said it was disappointed by the decision to charge the company and would "vigorously defend" the case.

See also
List of pharmaceutical manufacturers in the United Kingdom
Compounding

References

External links

 

2008 establishments in England
Pharmaceutical companies of the United Kingdom